The following are the statistics of the Turkish First Football League in season 1994/1995.

Overview
It was contested by 18 teams, and Beşiktaş J.K. won the championship.

League table

Results

Top scorers

References

Turkey - List of final tables (RSSSF)

Süper Lig seasons
1994–95 in Turkish football
Turkey